Central Community Unit School District 301 is a school district located mainly in Kane County, Illinois. It serves Burlington, Lily Lake, and portions of Elgin, Campton Hills, St. Charles and Pingree Grove, as well as several unincorporated areas such as Bowes, North Plato, Plato Center, and Udina. In 2013, the district served 4,638 students across seven (7) schools. The district currently has 7 schools. 

Five (5) Central 301 schools are “Exemplary” while two (2) others (Central High School and Lily Lake Grade School) were considered to be “Commendable” in the latest ISBE Report Card from the Illinois State Board of Education. Per ISBE, “Exemplary” schools perform in the top 10% of schools statewide with no underperforming student groups; while “Commendable” schools have no underperforming student groups and a graduation rate greater than 67%, with a performance that is not in the top 10% of schools statewide. Central 301 officials say they experienced a 7.3% increase in student enrollment in 2021-22 to 4,652 (K-12) students. Central 301 says that its classrooms saw a minimal increase in class size by only 0.2% in the same school year.

Schools
Central High School
Central Middle School (8th Grade)
Prairie Knolls Middle School (6th / 7th Grade)
Country Trails Elementary School
Howard B. Thomas Grade School
Lily Lake Grade School
Prairie View Grade School

References

External links

Interactive Illinois Report Card - for test results and other school accountability information.
Twitter
Facebook
Instagram
YouTube

School districts in Kane County, Illinois